East End is a census-designated place (CDP) in Saline County, Arkansas, United States. The population was 6,998 at the 2010 census. It is part of the Little Rock–North Little Rock–Conway Metropolitan Statistical Area.

Geography
East End is located at  (34.550639, -92.335662). Its nearest neighboring communities are Landmark, Shannon Hills, Bauxite and Sheridan.

East End has been the home of Marylake Carmelite Monastery since the 1950s. Scenes from Burt Reynolds' 1973 movie White Lightning were shot in and around the community.

Demographics

2020 census

As of the 2020 United States census, there were 7,137 people, 2,401 households, and 1,787 families residing in the CDP.

2000 census
As of the census of 2000, there were 5,623 people, 2,049 households, and 1,643 families residing in the CDP. The racial makeup of the CDP was 95.87% White, 0.87% Black or African American, 0.66% Native American, 0.87% Asian, 0.05% Pacific Islander, 0.32% from other races, and 1.35% from two or more races.  1.28% of the population were Hispanic or Latino of any race.

There were 2,049 households, out of which 41.0% had children under the age of 18 living with them, 67.1% were married couples living together, 9.2% had a female householder with no husband present, and 19.8% were non-families. 15.9% of all households were made up of individuals, and 4.1% had someone living alone who was 65 years of age or older.  The average household size was 2.74 and the average family size was 3.06.

In the CDP, the population was spread out, with 28.1% under the age of 18, 7.7% from 18 to 24, 33.4% from 25 to 44, 24.4% from 45 to 64, and 6.4% who were 65 years of age or older.  The median age was 34 years. For every 100 females, there were 103.0 males.  For every 100 females age 18 and over, there were 98.8 males.

The median income for a household in the CDP was $46,678, and the median income for a family was $49,649. Males had a median income of $31,396 versus $24,831 for females. The per capita income for the CDP was $19,198.  About 4.3% of families and 6.1% of the population were below the poverty line, including 8.3% of those under age 18 and 7.7% of those age 65 or over.

Education
East End's schools are part of the Sheridan School District.  The East End schools include East End Elementary grades K-2, East End Intermediate grades 3–5, and East End Middle grades 6–8.

References

External links
 http://www.city-data.com/city/East-End-Arkansas.html
 http://www.oureastend.com/index.html
 http://www.topix.com/city/east-end-ar

Census-designated places in Saline County, Arkansas
Census-designated places in Arkansas
Census-designated places in Little Rock–North Little Rock–Conway metropolitan area